Réda Benzine (born 19 April 1971) is an Algerian runner who specializes in the 5000 metres.

Achievements

Personal bests
1500 metres – 3:41.36 min (1995)
3000 metres – 7:41.85 min (2000)
5000 metres – 13:21.88 min (1995)
10,000 metres – 28:15.15 min (1999)

External links

1971 births
Living people
Algerian male long-distance runners
Athletes (track and field) at the 1996 Summer Olympics
Athletes (track and field) at the 2000 Summer Olympics
Olympic athletes of Algeria
Place of birth missing (living people)
21st-century Algerian people
20th-century Algerian people